Oru Sumangaliyude Katha is a 1984 Indian Malayalam-language film, directed by Baby, with story written by Oscar Movies' M. Bhaskar and produced by S. Kumar. The film stars Jagathy Sreekumar, Thikkurissy Sukumaran Nair, Ratheesh and Santhosh. The film has musical score by Shyam and Usha Uthup.

Cast

Sukumaran as Rajendran
Ambika as Yamuna
Jagathy Sreekumar as Sunil Kumar
Thikkurissy Sukumaran Nair as Yamuna's father
Ratheesh as Johnny
Santhosh
Captain Raju as SI Vijayan
Baby Jayaprabha as Neena
Baby Shalini as Raji
Bahadoor as Kumaradas
Jagannatha Varma as Doctor
Seema as Gracy
Vanitha Krishnachandran as Kalyani
Anuradha as Sophia

Soundtrack
The music was composed by Shyam and Usha Uthup with lyrics by P. Bhaskaran and Usha Uthup.

References

External links
 

1984 films
1980s Malayalam-language films
Films directed by Baby (director)